Janusz Różycki (born 10 May 1939) is a Polish fencer. He won a silver medal in the team foil event at the 1964 Summer Olympics.

He is the son of Jerzy Różycki, one of the three Polish mathematicians who worked on Enigma decryption from December 1932 through at least the Phoney War (1940).

References

1939 births
Living people
Polish male fencers
Olympic fencers of Poland
Fencers at the 1960 Summer Olympics
Fencers at the 1964 Summer Olympics
Olympic silver medalists for Poland
Olympic medalists in fencing
Fencers from Warsaw
Medalists at the 1964 Summer Olympics